The 2018–19 season was the 92nd season in ACF Fiorentina's history and their 81st in the top-flight of Italian football. Having finished 8th the previous season, Fiorentina competed only in Serie A and in the Coppa Italia.

The season was coach Stefano Pioli's second in charge of the club.

Players

Squad information
Last updated on 26 May 2019
Appearances include league matches only

Transfers

In

Loans in

Out

Loans out

Pre-season and friendlies

Competitions

Serie A

League table

Results summary

Results by round

Matches

Coppa Italia

Statistics

Appearances and goals

|-
! colspan=14 style="background:#9400D3; color:#FFFFFF; text-align:center"| Goalkeepers

|-
! colspan=14 style="background:#9400D3; color:#FFFFFF; text-align:center"| Defenders

|-
! colspan=14 style="background:#9400D3; color:#FFFFFF; text-align:center"| Midfielders

|-
! colspan=14 style="background:#9400D3; color:#FFFFFF; text-align:center"| Forwards

|-
! colspan=14 style="background:#9400D3; color:#FFFFFF; text-align:center"| Players transferred out during the season

Goalscorers

Last updated: 26 May 2019

Clean sheets

* Includes one shared clean sheet against Udinese.

Last updated: 26 May 2019

Disciplinary record
Last updated: 26 May 2019

References

ACF Fiorentina seasons
Fiorentina